Nikolskoye is a rural locality (a selo) in Progressovskoye Rural Settlement, Paninsky District, Voronezh Oblast, Russia. The population was 125 as of 2010. There are 2 streets.

Geography 
Nikolskoye is located 20 km east of Panino (the district's administrative centre) by road. Maryevka is the nearest rural locality.

References 

Rural localities in Paninsky District